The Lexikon der gesamten Technik is an illustrated German-language encyclopedia of architectural, engineering and manufacturing technology, written by Otto Lueger (German engineer, 1843–1911) and first published in 1894.

Editions 
 1st Edition, 7 volumes, 1894–1899
 2nd Edition, 8 volumes, 1904–1910 (with two supplements in 1914 and 1920)
 3rd Edition, 6 volumes, 1926–1929 (with a separate index volume)
 4th Edition, 17 volumes, 1960–1972

External links
http://www.zeno.org/Lueger-1904, 10 volumes, digitized by Zeno.org and announced as public domain ("Lizenz: Gemeinfrei")

German encyclopedias
German-language encyclopedias
Encyclopedias of science
1894 non-fiction books
Publications established in 1894
1894 in science
19th-century encyclopedias